The name Ellen was used for one tropical cyclone in the Atlantic Ocean.
 Hurricane Ellen (1973)

The name Ellen was also used for twelve tropical cyclones in the Western Pacific.
 Tropical Storm Ellen (1950) (T5042)
 Typhoon Ellen (1955) (T5509)
 Typhoon Ellen (1959) (T5906, 12W) – struck Japan.
 Typhoon Ellen (1961) (T6129, 69W)
 Tropical Storm Ellen (1964) (37W, Japan Meteorological Agency analyzed it as a tropical depression, not as a tropical storm.)
 Typhoon Ellen (1967) (T6711, 12W)
 Tropical Storm Ellen (1970) (T7014, 15W)
 Typhoon Ellen (1973) (T7306, 06W) – struck Japan. (ja)
 Tropical Storm Ellen (1976) (T7616, 16W) – struck Hong Kong.
 Typhoon Ellen (1980) (T8003, 04W)
 Typhoon Ellen (1983) (T8309, 10W, Herming) – struck the Philippines.
 Typhoon Ellen (1986) (T8620, 17W)

Atlantic hurricane set index articles
Pacific typhoon set index articles